Pedro López Rodríguez (born 21 January 1997) is a Spanish footballer who plays as a central defender.

Club career
Born in Lugo, Galicia, López was a CD Lugo youth graduate. He was promoted to the farm team ahead of the 2016–17 season, and made his senior debut on 28 August 2016 by starting in a 2–0 Tercera División home win against Xallas FC.

López made his first team debut on 21 August 2017, starting in a 0–0 home draw against CF Reus Deportiu in the Segunda División. He scored his first senior goal on 7 October 2018, netting Polvorín's only goal in a 1–2 home loss against CD Boiro.

On 9 July 2019, López was loaned to Segunda División B side Unionistas de Salamanca CF for the season. Upon returning, he featured rarely before leaving the club on 26 January 2022 by mutual agreement.

References

External links

1997 births
Living people
Spanish footballers
Footballers from Lugo
Association football defenders
Segunda División players
Segunda División B players
Tercera División players
Polvorín FC players
CD Lugo players
Unionistas de Salamanca CF players